Lower Seletar Reservoir (Chinese: 实里达蓄水池下段) is a reservoir located in the northern part of Singapore, to the east of Yishun New Town. The reservoir has a surface area of 3.6 km², and a capacity of 9.5 million m³. The mean depth of the reservoir is 2 m, with a maximum depth of 5.5 m. The shoreline length is 14.3 km.

History

Lower Seletar Reservoir was constructed under the Sungei Seletar/Bedok Water Scheme, completed in 1986. The scheme involved the damming of Sungei Seletar to form Lower Seletar Reservoir, the creation of Bedok Reservoir from a former sand quarry and the construction of Bedok Waterworks. Its unique feature was the construction of nine stormwater collection stations to tap the storm runoffs of the surrounding urbanised catchments. Eight of these collection stations are ponds at Yishun, Tampines, Bedok and Yan Kit.

Present

In 2004, Public Utilties Board (PUB) allowed sailing at Lower Seletar Reservoir. This was done in collaboration with the Singapore Sports Council (SSC) and the Seletar Country Club. This is the first time sailing was introduced in local reservoirs. Sports fishing is also carried out at designated areas of the Lower Seletar Reservoir.

See also
Upper Seletar Reservoir
List of Parks in Singapore

References

External links

Lower Seletar Reservoir Park

Parks in Singapore
Reservoirs in Singapore
Seletar
Yishun